Maqsudabad (also Romanized as Maqşūdābād; also known as Maqşūdābād-e Bālā, ‘Eşmatābād, ‘Ismatābād, and Maqşūdābād-e Bāla) is a village in Dughayi Rural District, in the Central District of Quchan County, Razavi Khorasan Province, Iran. At the 2006 census, its population was 903, in 210 families.

References 

Populated places in Quchan County